Los peruanos pasan (English: Peruvians pass) is a military march composed by Peruvian musician Carlos Valderrama Herrera (Trujillo 1887 - Lima 1950).

March in 2/4 rhythm, reminiscent of Roman trumpets, and drums, incorporates sounds linked to 'paso doble' Iberian and influences of pentatonic Andean tradition, revealing good balance and feeling great martial music. It is performed in parades Peruvian officials, such as the national holiday, and civilian and military ceremonies.

References

Alberto Tauro, Enciclopedia Ilustrada del Perú, volúmen 17, p. 2677, Editorial PEISA, Lima 2001

External links
 Los peruanos pasan

Peruvian military marches